Hestskjær Lighthouse is a coastal lighthouse located in Averøy Municipality in Møre og Romsdal county, Norway. The lighthouse was established in 1879 and automated in 1986.

The tower is a round, cylindrical tower that is white with a red top.

World War II
On 13 February 1944, the two ships SS Irma and SS Henry were sunk near Hestskjær.

See also

 List of lighthouses in Norway
 Lighthouses in Norway

References

External links

 Norsk Fyrhistorisk Forening 

Lighthouses completed in 1879
Lighthouses in Møre og Romsdal
Averøy